Farrance is a surname. Notable people with the surname include: 

Andrew Farrance (born 1972), Australian slalom canoeist 
David Farrance (born 1999), American ice hockey player
Mia Farrance (born 1973), Australian slalom canoeist